Lashkajan-e Olya (also Romanized as Lashkājān-e ‘Olyā; also known as Lashkājān and Lashkājān-e Bālā) is a village in Reza Mahalleh Rural District, in the Central District of Rudsar County, Gilan Province, Iran. At the 2006 census, its population was 323, in 107 families.

References 

Populated places in Rudsar County